Woolwich Polytechnic School for Girls is a secondary school located in the Thamesmead area of the Royal Borough of Greenwich in London, England.

The school was established in September 2019, constructed on a playing field of Woolwich Polytechnic School for Boys. It is a free school for girls aged 11 to 16, however a sixth form provision is offered in conjunction with Woolwich Polytechnic School for Boys on the boys' school site.

References

External links 
 

Secondary schools in the Royal Borough of Greenwich
Girls' schools in London
Educational institutions established in 2019
2019 establishments in England
Free schools in London